Nabalu is a monotypic genus of flowering plants belonging to the family Araceae. The only species is Nabalu corneri.

The species is found in Borneo.

References

Araceae
Monotypic Araceae genera